A number of ships of the French Navy have borne the name Conquérant (Conqueror). Amongst them:

 , a Citoyen-class 74-gun ship of the line
 , a 74-gun ship of the line
 , a Bucentaure-class 80-gun ship of the line

French Navy ship names